is a Japanese sailor. He competed at the 1996 Summer Olympics and the 2004 Summer Olympics.

References

External links
 

1966 births
Living people
Japanese male sailors (sport)
Olympic sailors of Japan
Sailors at the 1996 Summer Olympics – 470
Sailors at the 2004 Summer Olympics – 49er
Place of birth missing (living people)
Asian Games medalists in sailing
Sailors at the 1994 Asian Games
Sailors at the 1998 Asian Games
Medalists at the 1994 Asian Games
Medalists at the 1998 Asian Games
Asian Games gold medalists for Japan
Asian Games silver medalists for Japan